Menegazzia opuntioides is a species of foliose lichen from southern South America. It was first formally described as a new species in 1889 by Swiss botanist Johannes Müller Argoviensis, as a species of Parmelia. The type specimen was collected in the Strait of Magellan in southern Chile. Rolf Santesson transferred the taxon to the genus Menegazzia in 1942. Menegazzia opuntioides has also been recorded from Argentina.

See also
 List of Menegazzia species

References

opuntioides
Lichen species
Lichens described in 1889
Lichens of southern South America
Taxa named by Johannes Müller Argoviensis